Autoduel Champions is a 1983 game supplement published by Hero Games for Car Wars and Champions.

Contents
Autoduel Champions adapts Car Wars to Champions/Espionage, introduces the concept of superheroes to Car Wars with a heavily modified set of skills from Champions, and features rules for aerial combat, using helicopters.

Reception
Craig Sheeley reviewed Autoduel Champions in Space Gamer No. 66. Sheeley commented that "This supplement has everything you need for helicopters and heroes with either system.  Combined with the counters, map, and artwork, it's (pardon the expression) highway robbery for [the price]. I'd expect such a package to cost [more]. If you own Champions, Espionage, or Car Wars, it's more than worth the price."

Marcus L. Rowland reviewed Autoduel Champions for White Dwarf #48, giving it an overall rating of 8 out of 10, and stated that "All in all, I was very favourably impressed by Autoduel Champions – it's packed with useful ideas and devices in all three sections [...] and looks extremely good."

Jerry Epperson reviewed Autoduel Champions in Ares Magazine #17 and commented that "The Autoduel Champions game booklet is a fantastic addition to anyone's Champions game campaign. Those looking for an expansion of the car chase/combat rules should look into this one."

Reviews
 Different Worlds #35 (July/Aug., 1984)

References

Car Wars
Champions (role-playing game) supplements
Role-playing game supplements introduced in 1983